Smale's problems are a list of eighteen unsolved problems in mathematics proposed by Steve Smale in 1998 and republished in 1999. Smale composed this list in reply to a request from Vladimir Arnold, then vice-president of the International Mathematical Union, who asked several mathematicians to propose a list of problems for the 21st century. Arnold's inspiration came from the list of Hilbert's problems that had been published at the beginning of the 20th century.

Table of problems 

In later versions, Smale also listed three additional problems, "that don't seem important enough to merit a place on our main list, but it would still be nice to solve them:"
Mean value problem
Is the three-sphere a minimal set (Gottschalk's conjecture)?
Is an Anosov diffeomorphism of a compact manifold topologically the same as the Lie group model of John Franks?

See also 
 Millennium Prize Problems
 Simon problems

References 

Unsolved problems in mathematics